The 2018 International Tour of Rhodes was the 12th edition of the International Tour of Rhodes road cycling stage race. It was part of UCI Europe Tour in category 2.2.

Teams
Seventeen teams were invited to take part in the race. These included one UCI Professional Continental team, fifteen UCI Continental teams and one national team.

Route

Stages

Stage 1
9 March 2018 — Rhodes to Maritsa,

Stage 2
10 March 2018 — Rhodes to Koskinou,

Stage 3 
11 March 2018 — Rhodes to Rhodes,

Classification leadership table
In the 2018 Istrian Spring Trophy, three different jerseys were awarded for the main classifications. For the general classification, calculated by adding each cyclist's finishing times on each stage, the leader received a yellow jersey. This classification was considered the most important of the 2018 Istrian Spring Trophy, and the winner of the classification was considered the winner of the race.

Additionally, there was a points classification, which awarded a red jersey. In the points classification, cyclists received points for finishing in the top 3 in each intermediate sprint. For winning an intermediate sprint, a rider earned 5 points. There was also a mountains classification, the leadership of which was marked by a green jersey. In the mountains classification, points were won by reaching the top of a climb before other cyclists, with more points available for the higher-categorised climbs.

References

2018 UCI Europe Tour
2018 in Greek sport